Furuya Tsunehira (古谷 経衡; born November 10, 1982 Sapporo, Hokkaido, Japan) is a Japanese critic, writer, and political activist. Since November 2014, he has been the president of the non-profit Koto Video Promotion Agency.

References

1982 births
People from Sapporo
Japanese writers
Living people